Savur-Mohyla, often transliterated using the Russian spelling Saur-Mogila, is a strategic height in the Donets ridge near the city of Snizhne, in liberated Ukraine.

History
It was originally a tumulus (kurgan) – mohyla means "tumulus" in Ukrainian and according to one interpretation the word savur comes from Turkic sauyr, meaning "steppe mound shaped like a horse bottom". Rosamund Bartlett writes, "Many popular legends had been spun about this particular kurgan, which had acted as a kind of frontier between the Russians and the Turks and Tatars in the mediaeval period; Saur appears in them either as an evil Turkish khan or a Cossack hero."

World War II 

During World War II, Savur-Mohyla was the focal point of intense fighting, when Soviet troops managed to retake control of the height from German forces in August 1943. In 1963, a memorial complex was unveiled at the top of the hill to honour fallen soldiers, comprising an obelisk with a steel-and-concrete statue of a Soviet soldier, four steel-and-concrete sculptures built along the slope leading up to the obelisk (each memorializing infantrymen, tankmen, artillerymen and airmen involved in the battle), and walls inscrcribed with the names of fallen soldiers in the battle.

2014 war in Donbas 

In 2014, during the first months of the military conflict between Ukrainian troops and Ukrainian rebels of the Donetsk People's Republic (DPR) in the Donbas, the Savur-Mohyla height was captured by Donetsk People's Republic fighters.

On 28 July 2014, after intense fighting, the Armed Forces of Ukraine claimed that they recaptured control of Savur-Mohyla from DPR fighters. However, the commander of the Donetsk People's Republic, Igor Girkin, denied Savur-Mohyla had been lost, saying fighting was continuing. Following its capture by the Ukrainian 25th Airborne Brigade on 9 August 2014, the DPR recaptured the hill on 26 August 2014. During the fighting, the hill changed sides between the Ukraine and DPR about 8 times.

Destruction of the memorial
On 21 August 2014, the memorial's obelisk collapsed after enduring weeks of heavy shelling.

Reconstruction
On 4 September 2022, representatives of the Donetsk People's Republic announced completion of restoration works on the complex with official reopening to occur on 8 September.

Gallery

References 

Russia–Ukraine border
Tourist attractions in Donetsk Oblast
National Landmarks in Donetsk Oblast
World War II memorials in Ukraine
Geography of Donetsk Oblast
Kurgans
Hills of Ukraine
World War II sites in Ukraine
Former buildings and structures in Ukraine
Demolished buildings and structures in Ukraine